Hawthorne Dene is a grade II* listed building in Strawberry Vale, East Finchley, in London. It borders the North Circular Road.

The house was built by James Frost in 1826 who acquired land in the area in 1818. It is known for its innovative construction methods which include concrete and cast iron ceilings and banisters. It was listed in 1962 following a campaign by the comedian Spike Milligan.

References

External links 

Grade II* listed houses in London
Grade II* listed buildings in the London Borough of Barnet
Finchley